{{Infobox television
| image              = Ravenswood logo.png
| genre              = 
| creator            = 
| developer          =
| starring           = 
| executive_producer = 
| producer           = Nelson Soler
| cinematography     = 
| opentheme          = 
| composer           = 
| country            = United States
| language           = English
| camera             = 
| runtime            = 42 minutes
| company            = 
| distributor        = Warner Bros. Television Distribution
| channel            = ABC Family
| first_aired        = 
| last_aired         = 
| num_seasons        = 1
| num_episodes       = 10
| list_episodes      = 
| related            = Pretty Little Liars franchise 
}}Ravenswood is an American supernatural teen drama mystery-thriller television series created by I. Marlene King, Oliver Goldstick and Joseph Dougherty. The show premiered on ABC Family on October 22, 2013 and ended on February 4, 2014. It is the first spin-off series of Pretty Little Liars and the second series in the Pretty Little Liars franchise.

On February 14, 2014, Ravenswood was canceled by the network, due to low ratings after one season.

Plot
Set in the fictional town of Ravenswood, Pennsylvania, the series follows five strangers whose lives become intertwined by a deadly curse that has plagued their town for generations. They have to dig into the town's dark past to solve the mysterious curse.

Cast and characters
Main
 Nicole Gale Anderson as  / : Miranda meets Caleb on a bus to Ravenswood where she is going to find her uncle, Raymond Collins, her last remaining relative. Walking into her uncle's house, she helps Hanna escape, not knowing that she is Caleb's girlfriend. Miranda also finds a tombstone with her name and picture on it. Anderson also played the original version of Miranda in the 1910s, from the series' flashback scenes.
 Tyler Blackburn as  / : Caleb meets Miranda on the bus to Ravenswood where he's going to help his girlfriend, Hanna Marin. After Hanna meets Miranda and hears her story, she asks Caleb to stay in Ravenswood to help Miranda. Caleb finds a tombstone bearing his name and picture in the town cemetery and vows to stay until he figures out what it means. Blackburn also played the original version of Caleb in the 1910s, from the series' flashback scenes. 
 Steven Cabral as : Miranda's uncle who runs a funeral home. He sent Miranda into foster care when her parents died over 10 years ago. Miranda comes to Ravenswood to find him.
 Brett Dier as : Olivia's twin brother and Remy's boyfriend. Luke doesn't trust his twin sister's friends, and vows to protect both his mother and sister as the man of their family.
 Britne Oldford as : An employee at the Ravenswood Gazette, the town newspaper, where her father is the editor-in-chief, who helps Caleb find the death record of his look-alike. Remy is Luke's girlfriend and is the first to form a theory about the curse.
 Luke Benward as : Olivia's ex-boyfriend. In the series finale, he was revealed to be the murderer of Olivia's father, and is hit by a train at the end of the episode.
 Merritt Patterson as : Luke's twin sister. Olivia is more out in the open than her brother. She cares about what people think of her mother, but that doesn't stop her from living her life. Olivia formerly dated Dillon but the relationship ended after she found out Dillon killed her father.

Recurring
 Meg Foster as Carla Grunwald: A no-nonsense, stubborn 10-year resident of Ravenswood who used to be a house mother for a college sorority. She reprises her role from Pretty Little Liars. She has a sense for the paranormal and can see ghosts when she sleeps at night. She tries to make contact with Alison DiLaurentis and other deceased residents of Rosewood.
 Henry Simmons as Simon Beaumont: Remy's father who is distrustful of out-of-towners.
 Sophina Brown as Terry Beaumont: Remy's mother. She has recently returned home from military deployment and is struggling with survivor's guilt. Like the previous survivors, Terry could be the reason for her own daughter's near death.
 Haley Lu Richardson as Tess Hamilton: Olivia's former best friend who is not involved in the curse. Tess stakes her claim on the position of queen bee with Olivia off of the throne.
 Laura Allen as Rochelle Matheson: Luke and Olivia's mother. She is a confident woman and is the main suspect in the murder of her husband.
 Justin Bruening as Benjamin Price: a teacher at Ravenswood High School.
 Jay Huguley as Chief Tom Beddington
 Corrina Roshea as the Edwardian ghost.
 Mary Elise Hayden as Bea Hamilton: Carla's deceased mother.
 Griff Furst as Gabriel Abaddon

Guest
 Ashley Benson as Hanna Marin: Caleb's ex-girlfriend. Benson reprises her role from another series Pretty Little Liars.
 Bernard Curry as Jaime Doyle: Caleb's father. Curry reprises his role from Pretty Little Liars.

Development and production
On March 26, 2013, ABC Family was announced a spin-off series of Pretty Little Liars, set in a fictional town of Ravenswood from the original series. The show debuted on October 22, 2013, following the Pretty Little Liars Halloween special episode "Grave New World".

Casting
On April 30, 2013, it was revealed that Tyler Blackburn would reprise his Pretty Little Liars role as Caleb Rivers in Ravenswood. On May 6, 2013, it was revealed that Brett Dier and Elizabeth Whitson will play twins, Abel and Olivia, in the series. It was later stated that the character of Abel had been renamed Luke. On May 7, 2013, it was announced that Merritt Patterson would join the show as Olivia's best friend, Tess Hamilton. On May 10, 2013, it was announced that Nicole Gale Anderson would join the show as Miranda Collins. In May 2013, it was announced that Meg Foster would join the cast as Ravenswood resident Mrs. Grunwald, who made her first appearance in the fourth season episode "Under the Gun" of Pretty Little Liars. On July 16, 2013, it was announced that Merritt Patterson would be replacing Elizabeth Whitson in the role of Olivia. Whitson has now departed Ravenswood, and Patterson has changed roles. In August 2013, it was announced that Steven Cabral joined the cast as Raymond Collins (a character was originally played by Vince Lasalvia in "Grave New World"), Luke Benward joined the cast as Dillon, Henry Simmons joined the cast as Simon Beaumont, Sophina Brown joined the cast as Terry Beaumont, and Haley Lu Richardson joined the cast as a replacement for Patterson's former role of Tess. On August 27, 2013, it was announced that Justin Bruening joined the cast as Benjamin Price. In October 2013, Jay Huguley was announced to have joined the cast as Police Chief Tom Beddington. In November 2013, Mary Elise Hayden joined the cast as Bea Hamilton.

Filming
Filming started on August 21, 2013, in New Orleans, Louisiana.

Episodes
Backdoor pilot (2013)

Season 1 (2013–14)

Reception

Critical response
On review aggregator Rotten Tomatoes, the series holds an approval rating of 75% based on 12 reviews, with an average rating of 6.06/10. The site's consensus reads: "Darker than expected from a Pretty Little Liars spin-off, Ravenswood legitimately elicits chills and surprises with an attractive young cast."

Television critic David Hinckley of the New York Daily News gave the show 3 out of 5 stars, saying that the show was "entertaining, and creepier than its parent show." Scott D. Pierce of The Salt Lake Tribune said the show was "ridiculous, but might be fun." Margaret Lyons of New York Magazine Vulture'' claims the show "only meets generic expectations and needs to show us more than cheap fright-gags if it wants to avoid cancellation..."

References

External links
 

Pretty Little Liars (franchise)
2013 American television series debuts
2014 American television series endings
2010s American teen drama television series
2010s American mystery television series
2010s American horror television series
ABC Family original programming
American television spin-offs
American horror fiction television series
Horror drama television series
Serial drama television series
English-language television shows
Television series about teenagers
Television series about ghosts
Television series about twins
Television series by Alloy Entertainment
Television series by Warner Horizon Television
Television series set in the 1910s
Television series set in the 2010s
Television shows set in Pennsylvania
Television shows filmed in New Orleans
Magic realism television series